Peter James Marsh (19 October 1948 – 26 November 2012) was an Australian Paralympic athlete and table tennis player who competed at three Paralympic Games and won two bronze medals.

Personal

In June 1970, at the age of 21, Marsh sustained a spinal injury playing rugby league for Wests Panthers at Lang Park. He became a quadriplegic complete below C5–C6. Before the injury he had participated in surf lifesaving, and he was working as a motor mechanic at the time.

In 1976, the Paraplegic Welfare Association (now Spinal Injuries Association) employed him, their first employee with a disability,  as a welfare officer. He continued to work full-time for the organisation until 1983.  He was also involved as an administrator with wheelchair sports organisations and is a life member of Sporting Wheelies and Disabled Association. In 2008, he worked as a volunteer with the Marist College Ashgrove community service program.

Marsh died on 26 November 2012.  He is survived by his wife Anne and their son Kieran.

Career

At the 1976 Toronto Games, Marsh competed in athletics and table tennis and won two bronze medals in the Men's 60 m 1A and Men's Precision Club Throw 1A–1B events. He competed in athletics and table tennis at the 1980 Arnhem Games but did not win a medal. At the 1984 New York/Stoke Mandeville Games, he competed in three athletics events but did not win a medal.

References

External links
 

1948 births
2012 deaths
Paralympic athletes of Australia
Paralympic table tennis players of Australia
Paralympic bronze medalists for Australia
Paralympic medalists in athletics (track and field)
Athletes (track and field) at the 1976 Summer Paralympics
Athletes (track and field) at the 1980 Summer Paralympics
Athletes (track and field) at the 1984 Summer Paralympics
Table tennis players at the 1976 Summer Paralympics
Table tennis players at the 1980 Summer Paralympics
Medalists at the 1976 Summer Paralympics
Wheelchair category Paralympic competitors
People with tetraplegia
Sportsmen from Queensland